Sakumono is a small town before Nungua from Ashaiman. It is in the Tema Metropolitan district, a district in the Greater Accra Region of Ghana. It was originally a small fishing village on a lagoon, but by 2008 is being swallowed up as the twin cities of Nungua and Tema merge. Elevation is 71m. Sakumono is one of  the interesting towns, also known as Community 13. It has the main township which is close to the beach and lagoon. It also has a lot of sects of Estate buildings and jurisdiction.

Transport 
The town is served by a station of the Ghana Railway Corporation called Asoprochona and a main GPRTU of TUC vehicle station called Estate Junction. Vehicles going to Accra, Circle, Nungua, Tema, Lashibi, Klagon, Ashaiman, Spintex, Airport, East Legon, Madina, Accra Mall (Tetteh Quarshie Roundabout) and Lapaz can all be found at Estate Junction.

See also 
 Railway stations in Ghana

References 

Populated places in the Greater Accra Region